Blood Meridian or the Evening Redness in the West is a 1985 epic novel by American author Cormac McCarthy, classified under the Western, or sometimes the anti-Western, genre. McCarthy's fifth book, it was published by Random House.

In a loosely historical context the narrative follows a fictional teenager referred to as "the kid," with the bulk of the text devoted to his experiences with the Glanton gang, a historical group of scalp hunters who massacred Indigenous Americans and others in the United States–Mexico borderlands from 1849 to 1850 for bounty, pleasure, and eventually out of nihilistic habit. The role of antagonist is gradually filled by Judge Holden, a physically massive, highly educated, preternaturally skilled member of the gang who is extremely pale and completely bald from head to toe.

Although the novel initially received lukewarm critical and commercial reception, it has since become highly acclaimed and is widely recognized as McCarthy's magnum opus and one of the greatest American novels of all time. Some have labelled it the Great American Novel. There have been multiple attempts to adapt the novel into a film, but none have succeeded.

Plot summary
The novel tells the story of a teenaged runaway referred to only as "the kid", who was born in Tennessee during the famously active Leonids meteor shower of 1833. He first meets the enormous, pale, hairless Judge Holden at a religious revival in a tent in Nacogdoches, Texas, at which Holden falsely accuses the preacher of raping children and goats, inciting the audience to attack him.

After a violent encounter with a bartender establishes the kid as a formidable fighter, he joins a party of ill-equipped  U.S. Army irregulars on a filibustering mission led by a Captain White. White's group is overwhelmed by an accompanying group of hundreds of Comanche warriors, and few of them survive. Arrested as a filibuster in Chihuahua, the kid is set free when his acquaintance Toadvine tells the authorities they will make useful Indian hunters. They join Glanton and his gang, among them Holden, and the bulk of the novel is devoted to detailing their activities and conversations. Though originally tasked with protecting locals from marauding Apaches, the gang devolves into the outright murder of unthreatening Indians, unprotected Mexican villages, and eventually even the Mexican army and anyone else who crosses their path.

According to the kid's new companion Ben Tobin, an "ex-priest", the Glanton gang first met Judge Holden while fleeing for their lives from a much larger Apache group. In the middle of a blasted desert, they found Holden sitting on an enormous boulder, where he seemed to be waiting for the gang. They agreed to follow his leadership, and he took them to an extinct volcano where he instructed them on how to manufacture gunpowder, enough to give them the advantage against the Apaches. When the kid remembers seeing Holden in Nacogdoches, Tobin tells the kid that each man in the gang claims to have met the judge at some point before joining the Glanton Gang.

After months of marauding, the gang crosses into U.S. territory, where they eventually set up a systematic and brutal robbing operation at a ferry on the Colorado River at Yuma, Arizona. Local Yuma (Quechan) Indians are at first approached to help the gang wrest control of the ferry from its original owners, but Glanton's gang betrays and slaughters them. After a while, the Yumas attack and kill most of the gang. The kid, Toadvine, and Tobin are among the survivors who flee into the desert, though the kid takes an arrow in the leg. The kid and Tobin head west, and come across Holden, who first negotiates, then threatens them for their gun and possessions. Holden shoots Tobin in the neck, and the wounded pair hide among bones by a desert creek. Tobin repeatedly urges the kid to fire upon Holden. The kid does so, but misses his mark.

The survivors continue their travels, ending up in San Diego. The kid is separated from Tobin and is subsequently imprisoned. Holden visits the kid in jail, and tells him that he has told the jailers "the truth": that the kid alone was responsible for the end of the Glanton gang. The kid is released on recognizance and seeks a doctor to treat his wound. While recovering from the "spirits of ether", he hallucinates the judge visiting him along with a curious man who forges coins. The kid recovers and seeks out Tobin, with no luck. He makes his way to Los Angeles, where Toadvine and another member of the Glanton gang, David Brown, are hanged for their crimes.

In 1878 the kid, now in his mid-40s and referred to as "the man", makes his way to Fort Griffin, Texas. At a saloon he meets the judge, who seems not to have aged in the intervening years. Holden calls the kid "the last of the true," and the pair talk. Holden declares that the kid has arrived at the saloon for "the dance" – the dance of violence, war, and bloodshed that the judge had so often praised. The kid disputes Holden's ideas, telling the judge "You aint nothin," and, noting the performing bear at the saloon, states, "even a dumb animal can dance." Afterwards, the kid goes to an outhouse under another meteor shower. In the outhouse, he is surprised by the naked judge, who "gathered him in his arms against his immense and terrible flesh." Later, two men open the door to the outhouse and can only gaze in awed horror at what they see, one of them stating "Good God almighty." The last paragraph finds the judge back in the saloon, dancing and playing fiddle among the drunkards and the prostitutes, saying that he will never die. The fate of the kid is left unstated.

In the epilogue, a man is augering lines of holes across the prairie, perhaps for fence posts. The man sparks a fire in each of the holes, and an assortment of wanderers trail behind him.

Characters

Major characters
The kid: The novel's anti-heroic protagonist or pseudo-protagonist, the kid is an illiterate Tennessean whose mother died in childbirth. At fourteen he flees from his father to Texas. He is said to have a disposition for violence and is involved in vicious actions throughout. He takes up inherently violent professions, specifically being recruited by violent criminals including Captain White, and later by Glanton and his gang, thereby securing release from a prison in Chihuahua, Mexico. The kid takes part in many of the Glanton gang's scalp-hunting rampages, but gradually displays a moral fiber that ultimately puts him at odds with the Judge. "The kid" is later as an adult referred to as "the man".
 Judge Holden, or "the judge": A huge, pale and hairless man who often seems almost mythical or supernatural. He is a polyglot and polymath and a keen examiner and recorder of the natural world. He is extremely violent and deviant. He is said to have accompanied Glanton's gang since they found him sitting alone on a rock in the middle of the desert and he saved them from pursuing Apaches. It is hinted that he and Glanton have some manner of pact. He gradually becomes the antagonist to the kid after the dissolution of Glanton's gang, occasionally having brief reunions with the kid. Unlike the rest of the gang, Holden is socially refined and remarkably well educated; however, he perceives the world as ultimately violent, fatalistic, and liable to an endless cycle of bloody conquest, with human nature and autonomy defined by the will to violence; he asserts, ultimately, that "War is god." He is based partly on the historical character of Judge Holden. 
 John Joel Glanton, or simply Glanton: the American leader, or "captain", of a gang of scalphunters who murder Indians and Mexican civilians and military alike. His history and appearance are not clarified except that he is physically small with black hair and has a wife and child in Texas. He is a clever strategist. His last major action is to take control of a profitable Colorado River ferry, which ultimately leads to an ambush by Yuma Indians in which he is killed. He is based partly on the historical character of John Joel Glanton.
 Louis Toadvine: A seasoned outlaw with whom the kid brawls and then burns down a hotel. Toadvine has no ears and his forehead is branded with the letters H and T (horse thief) and F. He reappears unexpectedly as a cellmate of the kid in the Chihuahua prison. From here he mendaciously negotiates the release of himself and the kid and one other inmate into Glanton's gang. Toadvine is not as depraved as some of the gang but is nonetheless a violent criminal. He is hanged in Los Angeles alongside David Brown.
 Ben Tobin, "the priest", or "the ex-priest": A member of the gang and formerly a novice of the Society of Jesus. Tobin remains deeply religious. He feels an apparently friend-like bond with the kid and abhors the judge and his philosophy. He and the judge gradually become great spiritual enemies. He survives the Yuma massacre of Glanton's gang, but is shot in the neck by the judge. In San Diego with the kid he goes off to look for a doctor but nothing more is known of him.

Other recurring characters
 Captain White, or "the captain": An ex-professional soldier and American supremacist who believes that Mexico is a lawless nation destined to be conquered by the United States. Captain White leads a patchwork company of militants into Mexico along with the recently recruited "Kid". After weeks of travel through the harsh Mexican desert, the company is ambushed by a Comanche war party. Captain White makes his escape with a few "officers" but is ultimately caught, beheaded, and subsequently has his head "pickled". 
 David Brown: A member of the gang who wears a necklace of human ears. He is arrested in San Diego and Glanton seems especially concerned to see him released. He brings about his own release but does not return to the gang before the Yuma massacre. He is hanged with Toadvine in Los Angeles.
 John Jackson: "John Jackson" is a name shared by two men in Glanton's gangone black and one whitewho detest one another and whose tensions frequently rise  when in each other's presence. After trying to drive the black Jackson away from a campfire with a threat of violence, "White Jackson" is decapitated. "Black Jackson" assumes an integral role in the gang. While still referred to by numerous slurs, Jackson is nonetheless treated as part of a "body" that cannot have any part killed or violated, as Judge Holden goes to great lengths to rescue him after a confrontation on a mountain pass.

Themes

Violence

A major theme is the warlike nature of man. Critic Harold Bloom praised Blood Meridian as one of the best 20th century American novels, "worthy of Herman Melville's Moby-Dick," but admitted that his "first two attempts to read through Blood Meridian failed, because [he] flinched from the overwhelming carnage". Caryn James argued that the novel's violence was a "slap in the face" to modern readers cut off from brutality. Terrence Morgan thought the effect of the violence initially shocking but then waned until the reader was desensitized. Billy J. Stratton contends that the brutality is the primary mechanism through which McCarthy challenges binaries and promotes his revisionist agenda. Lilley argues that many critics struggle with the fact that McCarthy does not use violence for "jury-rigged, symbolic plot resolutions . . . In McCarthy's work, violence tends to be just that; it is not a sign or symbol of something else." Others have noted that McCarthy depicts characters of all backgrounds as evil, in contrast to contemporary "revisionist theories that make white men the villains and Indians the victims."

Epigraphs

Three epigraphs open the book: quotations from French writer Paul Valéry, from German Christian mystic Jacob Boehme, and a 1982 news clipping from the Yuma Sun reporting the claim of members of an Ethiopian archeological excavation that a fossilized skull three hundred millennia old seemed to have been scalped. Regarding the meaning of the epigraphs, D. H. Evans writes that

Ending

The narrative closes with ambiguity pertaining to the final state of the kid, or the man. Since the book portrays violence in explicit detail this allusive portrayal has caused comment.

Given the judge's history and other details in the text, presumably the judge rapes the man before killing him. Alternatively, perhaps the point is that readers can never know.

Religion

Hell
David Vann argues that the setting of the American southwest which the Gang traverses is representative of hell. Vann claims that the Judge's kicking of a head is an allusion to Dante's similar action in the Inferno.

Gnosticism
The second of the three epigraphs which introduce the novel, taken from the "Gnostic" mystic Jacob Boehme, has incited varied discussion. The quote from Boehme is: 

No specific conclusions have been reached about its interpretation nor relevance to the novel. Critics agree that there are Gnostic elements in Blood Meridian, but they disagree on the precise meaning and implication of those elements.

Leo Daugherty argues that "Gnostic thought is central to Cormac McCarthy's Blood Meridian", (Daugherty, 122) specifically the Persian-Zoroastrian-Manichean branch of Gnosticism. He describes the novel as a "rare coupling of Gnostic 'ideology' with the 'affect' of Hellenic tragedy by means of depicting how power works in the making and erasing of culture, and of what the human condition amounts to when a person opposes that power and thence gets introduced to fate." Daugherty sees Holden as an archon and the kid as a "failed pneuma." He says that the kid feels a "spark of the alien divine."

Daugherty further contends that the violence of the novel can best be understood through a Gnostic lens. "Evil" as defined by the Gnostics was a far larger, more pervasive presence in human life than the rather tame and "domesticated" Satan of Christianity. As Daugherty writes, "For [Gnostics], evil was simply everything that is, with the exception of bits of spirit imprisoned here. And what they saw is what we see in the world of Blood Meridian."

However, Barcley Owens argues that while there are undoubtedly Gnostic qualities to the novel, Daugherty's arguments are "ultimately unsuccessful," because Daugherty fails to adequately address the pervasive violence and because he overstates the kid's goodness.

Theodicy
Douglas Canfield asserts that theodicy is the central theme of Blood Meridian. James Wood took a similar position, recognizing as a recurrent theme in the novel the issue of the general justification of metaphysical goodness in the presence of evil. Chris Dacus expressed his preference for discussing the theme of theodicy in its eschatological terms in comparison to the theological scene of the last judgment. This preference for reading theodicy as an eschatological theme was further affirmed by Harold Bloom in his recurrent phrase of referring to the novel as "The Authentic Apocalyptic Novel."

Background

McCarthy began writing Blood Meridian in the mid-1970s. In a letter sent around 1979 he said that he had not touched Blood Meridian in six months out of frustration. Nonetheless significant parts of the final book were written in one go, "including the astonishing 'legion of horribles' passage".  McCarthy worked on the novel while living on the money from his 1981 MacArthur Fellows grant. It was his first attempt at a western and his first novel set in the Southwestern United States, a change from the Appalachian settings of his earlier work.

In 1974 McCarthy moved from his native Tennessee to El Paso, Texas, to immerse himself in the culture and geography of the American Southwest. He taught himself Spanish, which many of the characters of Blood Meridian speak. McCarthy conducted considerable research to write the book. Critics have repeatedly demonstrated that even brief and seemingly inconsequential passages of Blood Meridian rely on historical evidence. The book has been described as "as close to history as novels generally get".

The Glanton gang segments are based on Samuel Chamberlain's account of the group in his memoir My Confession: The Recollections of a Rogue. Chamberlain rode with John Joel Glanton and his company between 1849 and 1850. Judge Holden is described in Chamberlain's account but is otherwise unknown. Chamberlain writes:

McCarthy's judge was added to his manuscript in the late 1970s, a "grotesque patchwork of up-river Kurtz and Milton's Satan" and Chamberlain's account.

McCarthy followed the Glanton Gang's trail through Mexico multiple times and noted topography and fauna. He studied such topics as homemade gunpowder to accurately depict the judge's creation from volcanic rock.

Style
McCarthy's writing style involves many unusual or archaic words, dialogue in Spanish, no quotation marks for dialogue, and no apostrophes to signal most contractions. McCarthy told Oprah Winfrey in an interview that he prefers "simple declarative sentences" and that he uses capital letters, periods, an occasional comma, a colon for setting off a list, but never semicolons. He believes there is no reason to "blot the page up with weird little marks". The New York Times described McCarthy's prose in Blood Meridian as "Faulknerian". Describing events of extreme violence, McCarthy's prose is sparse yet expansive, with an often biblical quality and frequent religious references.

Reception and reevaluation
Blood Meridian initially received little recognition, but has since been recognized as a masterpiece and one of the greatest works of American literature. Some have called it the Great American Novel. American literary critic Harold Bloom praised Blood Meridian as one of the 20th century's finest novels. Aleksandar Hemon has called it "possibly the greatest American novel of the past 25 years". David Foster Wallace named it one of the five most underappreciated American novels since 1960 and "[p]robably the most horrifying book of this [20th] century, at least [in] fiction."

Time magazine included Blood Meridian in its "Time 100 Best English-language Novels from 1923 to 2005". In 2006 The New York Times conducted a poll of writers and critics regarding the most important works in American fiction from the previous 25 years, and Blood Meridian was a runner-up.

Literary significance
There has been no consensus in the interpretation of the novel, and it has been said that the work "seems designed to elude interpretation". One scholar has described Blood Meridian as: Nonetheless academics and critics have suggested that Blood Meridian is nihilistic or strongly moral, a satire of the western genre or a savage indictment of Manifest Destiny. Harold Bloom called it "the ultimate western". J. Douglas Canfield described it as "a grotesque Bildungsroman in which we are denied access to the protagonist's consciousness almost entirely".  Richard Selzer declared that McCarthy "is a geniusalso probably somewhat insane." Critic Steven Shaviro wrote:

Attempted film adaptations

Since the novel's release many have noted its cinematic potential. The New York Times 1985 review noted that the novel depicted "scenes that might have come off a movie screen". There have been attempts to create a motion picture adaptation of Blood Meridian, but all have failed during the development or pre-production stages. A common perception is that the story is "unfilmable" due to its unrelenting violence and dark tone. In an interview with The Wall Street Journal in 2009 McCarthy denied this notion, with his perspective being that it would be "very difficult to do and would require someone with a bountiful imagination and a lot of balls. But the payoff could be extraordinary."

Screenwriter Steve Tesich first adapted Blood Meridian into a screenplay in 1995. In the late 1990s Tommy Lee Jones acquired the film adaptation rights to the story and subsequently rewrote Tesich's screenplay with the idea of directing and playing a role in it. The production could not move forward due to film studios avoiding the project's overall violence.

Following the end of production for Kingdom of Heaven in 2004 screenwriter William Monahan and director Ridley Scott entered discussions with producer Scott Rudin for adapting Blood Meridian with Paramount Pictures financing. In a 2008 interview with Eclipse Magazine Scott confirmed that the screenplay had been written, but that the extensive violence was proving to be a challenge for film standards. This later led to Scott and Monahan leaving the project, resulting in another abandoned adaptation.

By early 2011 James Franco was considering adapting Blood Meridian, along with a number of other William Faulkner and Cormac McCarthy novels. After being persuaded by Andrew Dominik to adapt the novel, Franco shot 25 minutes of test footage starring Scott Glenn, Mark Pellegrino, Luke Perry, and Dave Franco. For undisclosed reasons, Rudin denied further production of the film. On May 5, 2016, Variety revealed that Franco was negotiating with Rudin to write and direct an adaptation to be brought to the Marché du Film, starring Russell Crowe, Tye Sheridan, and Vincent D'Onofrio. However, it was reported later that day that the project dissolved due to issues with the film rights.

References

Bibliography

Further reading

External links

 James, C., Blood Meridian by Cormac McCarthy, The New York Times, Apr 1985
 Blood Meridian by Cormac McCarthy, reviewed by Ted Gioia ( The New Canon)
 NPR interview with Ben Nichols about his record The Last Pale Light in the West, inspired by Blood Meridian

1985 American novels
Novels by Cormac McCarthy
American bildungsromans
American historical novels
Western (genre) novels
Novels set in Texas
Novels set in Mexico
Novels set in Arizona
Novels set in California
Fiction set in 1849
Fiction set in 1850
Fiction set in 1878
Fiction about immortality
Novels set in the 1840s
Novels set in the 1850s
Novels set in the 1870s